The 2020–21 season was the 4th season in the existence of Juventus and the club's 4th consecutive season in the top flight of Italian women's football. In addition to the domestic league, Juventus participated in this season's editions of the Coppa Italia, the Supercoppa Italiana, and the UEFA Champions League.

Juventus were eliminated from the Champions League against Lyon, losing 6–2 on aggregate in the round of 32. Juventus were also eliminated from the Coppa Italia against Roma; they drew 4–4 on aggregate in the semi-finals, and were eliminated on the away goals rule.

After beating Roma in the semi-finals of the Supercoppa Italiana, Juventus advanced to the final against Fiorentina, which they won 2–0. On 8 May 2021, Juventus were mathematically confirmed four-time champions of Italy, after beating Napoli 2–0. With its fourth consecutive national title, Juventus equaled the national record of league titles reached by Torres in 2013. They finished the season winning all 22 league matches, becoming the ninth team in the women's top flight to win unbeaten the competition and the first in Italian football history, men or women, to accomplish a perfect season having won all their league matches.

Pre-season and friendlies

Overview 
On 2 August 2020, Juventus played a friendly against Florentia scoring six goals. Florentia's goal was scored by Sofia Cantore in the 68th minute who was loaned from Juventus in this season. On 8 August, they won 4–0 against Servette. Both games were played at home. 

Juventus participated in the "Trophée Femenine Veolia", playing two more games against French sides in the Parc Olympique Lyonnais in Lyon. On 13 August, Juventus played their first game of the tournament, a 2–1 victory against Montpellier. Juventus captain Sara Gama gave them the lead through a heel strike in the 44th minute. In the 60th minute, Barbara Bonansea scored in an individual action, and later assisted Andrea Stašková. Eight minutes later, Dutchwoman Anouk Dekker scored the final goal, due to an error from Laura Giuliani. Two days later, Juventus lost 3–0 in the decisive match against Lyon, who won the competition. In the 28th minute, Lyon's captain Wendie Renard scored a goal with a header from a corner kick. Four minutes later, Kadeisha Buchanan doubled the result, with another header from a corner kick. In the 78th minute, Melvine Malard scored the final goal due to an error from Doris Bačić.

Matches 
Results list Juventus' goal tally first.

Serie A

Overview 

Juventus' first match in this season was on 22 August 2020—a 2–0 away victory over Hellas Verona. Seven days later, Juventus beat Empoli with a result of 4–3. On 6 September, Juventus played their only match that took place in this month and it was a 2–0 home victory. On 5 October, Juventus won 1–0 away to AC Milan with Girelli's penalty kick in the 12th minute. After this match, Juventus played other two matches, both won 4–0 against Fiorentina and Pink Bari, which played with 10 players due to Louise Quinn's red card in the 12th minute. Juventus' first match in November was a 4–0 victory against Sassuolo. They also played another match in November; it was a 2–1 victory against Florentia. With the aforementioned victory, Juventus was the first team to make 18 consecutive victories in the women's Serie A. On December, Juventus played two matches: a 2–1 victory against Napoli and a 4–1 win over Roma. Juventus' games in January were a 3–0 victory against Inter Milan and a 5–0 win over Hellas Verona. In February, Juventus won 3–0 against Empoli and 3–1 against San Marino. On 7 March, Juventus won 4–0 against AC Milan. On 20 March, they won 2–1 against Fiorentina. Eight days later, Juventus won 9–1 against Pink Bari. On 18 April, Juventus won their only match played in this month, with a 3–0 victory over Sassuolo. In May, they played and won four matches: 6–1 against Florentia, 2–0 over Napoli, 1–0 against Roma and 5–0 over Inter Milan.

Matches
Results list Juventus' goal tally first.

League table

Coppa Italia

Overview 
Juventus were drawn into a three-team group to play against Pink Bari and Pomigliano. Juventus did not play on Matchday 1. Juventus were due to play on Matchday 2 against Pomigliano on 19–20 October 2020, but due to players testing positive for COVID-19, the match was postponed to 19 November. However, on 16 November the match was postponed again to 13 January 2021. On 22 November, Juventus won 4–1 against Pink Bari. On 13 January 2021, Juventus won 5–1 on Matchday 2 against Pomigliano, advancing to the quarter-finals. On 30 January, Juventus won with a spectacular result of 5–4 the first leg of the quarter-finals over Empoli, in which the three goal scored by Benedetta Glionna for the opponents were from a free-kick. On 13 February, Juventus won the second leg with a 5–0 victory qualifying to the semi-finals winning 10–4 on aggregate. On 13 March, Juventus lost 2–1 in the first leg over Roma. Despite the 3–2 victory in the second leg, on 25 April, Juventus drew 4–4 on aggregate, being eliminated due to the away-goals rule.

Matches 
Results list Juventus' goal tally first.

Supercoppa Italiana

Overview 
Since Juventus was one of the top four teams of the previous league season, they qualified for the Supercoppa Italiana. The format of the competition was changed, increasing the number of teams participating in the competition from two to four, playing the semi-finals and final at the Stadio Comunale, Chiavari. Juventus played the semi-finals on 6 January 2021 against Roma, which was beaten 2–1 after extra-time through Bonansea and Girelli's goals. On 10 January, Juventus played the final against Fiorentina, winning 2–0 with a Barbara Bonansea brace. This victory was Juventus' second trophy after the one won in the previous season.

Matches 
Results list Juventus' goal tally first.

Champions League

Overview 
Since Juventus won the league in the previous season, they qualified for the round of 32 of the competition. On 24 November 2020, Juventus was drawn to play against Lyon. On 9 December, Juventus was beaten by Lyon 3–2 in the first leg at home, despite Hurtig's goal and an own goal. Six days later, Juventus lost the second leg 3–0 away. Lyon won the tie 5–3 on aggregate.

Matches 
Results list Juventus' goal tally first.

Player details 

|}

Transfers

Summer

In

Out

See also 
 2020–21 Juventus F.C. season
 2020–21 Juventus F.C. Under-23 season
 List of unbeaten football club seasons

Notes

References 

Juventus F.C. (women) seasons
Juventus
Juventus W